The Guadalupe or Guadalupejo river is a right hand tributary of the Guadiana, in Spain. The Francization of the toponym gave its name to the Guadeloupe island in the Caribbeans.

Course
The Guadalupe has its sources in the Sierra de Villuercas near Guadalupe, giving its name to the town, and by extension to the monastery of Santa María de Guadalupe.

It flows southwards into the Guadiana at the Garcia de Sola Dam, barely 1.5 km east of Valdecaballeros. There is an abandoned nuclear power plant, the Valdecaballeros Nuclear Power Plant, as well as a small dam near its mouth.

Etymology
The name is believed to be derived from the Arabic phrase , because the river narrows down as it flows near to the town of Guadalupe.

An alternative etymological explanation, which is commonly found on the internet, states that the name may have derived from the Arabic word for 'valley' or 'river' (wadi) and the Latin word lupus, meaning 'wolf'.

See also 
 List of rivers of Spain

References

External link

Rivers of Spain
Rivers of Extremadura
Our Lady of Guadalupe
Tributaries of the Guadiana River